A ball boy is a person who retrieves balls for players or officials in tennis and other sports.

Ball boy or ballboy may also refer to:

 Ball Boys, an American reality television show
 Ball Boy (Beano), a comic strip character from The Beano
 Ballboy, a character in the Japanese tokusatsu series Seiun Kamen Machineman
 Ballboy (band), a Scottish indie group